Coleophora derrai is a moth of the family Coleophoridae. It is found in Spain.

References

derrai
Moths described in 1985
Moths of Europe